Aillik may refer to:

 Aillik, Newfoundland and Labrador, Canada
 Aillik Bay, Newfoundland and Labrador, Canada